Boghe may refer to :
 the lead vocalist of a Sardinian tenores ensemble, according to the article Italian music terminology
 a town in the Brakna region of Mauritania